The Women's 5 kilometre cross-country skiing event was part of the cross-country skiing programme at the 1976 Winter Olympics, in Innsbruck, Austria. It was the fourth appearance of the event. The competition was held on 7 February 1976, at the Cross Country Skiing Stadium.

Results

References

Women's cross-country skiing at the 1976 Winter Olympics
Women's 5 kilometre cross-country skiing at the Winter Olympics
Oly
Cross